Let It Ride is a 1989 American comedy film. It was directed by Joe Pytka (in his feature non-documentary debut) from a screenplay by Nancy Dowd (credited as Ernest Morton) based on the 1979 novel Good Vibes by Jay Cronley. It stars Richard Dreyfuss, David Johansen, Teri Garr, and Allen Garfield. The story is centered on a normally unsuccessful habitual gambler who experiences a day in which he wins every bet he places, and focuses on the personality contrasts and the perpetually upbeat, hopeful attitudes of losers.

Let It Ride was primarily filmed at Hialeah Park Race Track, which was closed in 2001 and reopened on November 28, 2009. The film was released in the United States on August 18, 1989, by Paramount Pictures.

Plot
Jay Trotter and his best friend Looney are cab drivers. Looney records his passengers' private conversations with a hidden microphone. Looney has a new tape of two men talking about an upcoming horse race and how one of the race horses, due to unethical practice by its owner and trainer, ("they were holding the horse back") is a sure thing to win big. Trotter and Looney go to the track to place a $50.00 win bet on the horse, despite the fact that Trotter told his wife Pam the day before that he would quit betting forever and stay home to "start their marriage over" at noon. In the restroom of the bar next door to the racetrack, he prays to God, saying, "just one big day, that's all I'm asking for, one day, I'm due." A man exiting the bathrooms overhears him, and says "Yeah? So's Jesus. Let it ride." Trotter promptly places a $50 bet on the tipped horse. Looney refuses to bet the tip, instead betting on a horse named "June Bug" - the same name as a cat Looney once owned. Trotter's horse wins the race in a photo finish and pays $28.40 to win (earning Trotter $710).

Armed with a newfound sense of confidence, after cashing his winning bet, Trotter approaches the two men from Looney's cab ride and generously gives them the tape of their taxi conversation. Out of gratitude, they give Trotter a good tip for the next race. He places a large bet and wins again.

Sensing that this could be his "lucky day," Trotter intends to "let it ride" (parlaying all of his track winnings on every race). Just before the next race, before he can make another bet on a horse suggested by someone else, Trotter is suddenly arrested in a case of mistaken identity. After he is released, he realizes the horse he was going to bet has lost. Now, he really feels this is his "lucky day". After being released, Trotter resumes his lucky wagering streak. As he accumulates more money, and uses his new clubhouse friends' membership in the track's exclusive clubhouse dining room, he starts meeting other well-to-do gamblers, including the wealthy Mrs. Davis and a sexy vixen named Vicki. Trotter soon becomes a hero to the ticket seller, whose window he uses to wager every time, and to the customers of the track's bar. He also hires a track security guard to protect him.

However, Trotter has neglected his wife Pam, who realizes he must be at the racetrack. She confronts him at the track clubhouse and flies into a rage. Trotter calms her down a bit, and tells her of his hot streak. Unable to decide on a horse in the next race, Trotter takes a survey of the track patrons and, eliminating any selection they give him, bets on the remaining horse, Fleet Dreams, who wins. Trotter decides to call it a day and goes home to Pam, buying her a diamond necklace on the way. At home he finds Pam intoxicated and passed out.

He heads back to the track to help the patrons of Marty's bar across the street, but when he suggests sharing his luck by betting their money together, they all balk at the idea. Disconcerted, Trotter goes for a walk around the track. Vicki suddenly offers to go to bed with him. Trotter breaks the fourth wall by saying to the audience, "Am I having a good day or what?" Ultimately, he turns down Vicki by professing his love for his wife.

Trotter makes a final bet of $68,000 (his total winnings for the day) after Looney advises him not to bet on Hot to Trot. As the race begins, Looney and Trotter argue over everything, and the main characters all make resolutions. Vicki vows to give up rich guys and consider a poor one, looking at Looney. The race comes down to a photo finish. While everyone awaits the result, Pam shows up to thank Jay for his lovely gift and to tell him not to worry about the money, when the announcer reports the winner: Hot to Trot. The entire racetrack erupts in celebration, and Pam asks, "Why is everyone cheering?" Jay replies, "Because I'm having a very good day."

Cast
 Richard Dreyfuss as Jay Trotter
 David Johansen as Looney
 Teri Garr as Pam Trotter
 Jennifer Tilly as Vicki
 Allen Garfield as Greenberg
 Robbie Coltrane as Ticket Seller
 Michelle Phillips as Mrs. Davis
 Cynthia Nixon as Evangeline
 Ralph Seymour as Sid
 Richard Edson as Johnny Casino
 Trevor Denman as Race Track Announcer
 Edward Walsh as Marty (as Ed Walsh)

Reception
Let It Ride has a rating of 27% on Rotten Tomatoes based on 11 reviews.

References

External links
 
 
 

1989 films
1989 comedy films
1989 directorial debut films
American comedy films
American horse racing films
Films about horses
Films based on American novels
Films directed by Joe Pytka
Films scored by Giorgio Moroder
Films set in Miami
Films shot in Miami
Films about gambling
Paramount Pictures films
1980s English-language films
1980s American films
Films based on novels by Jay Cronley